The 2019 Lamar Cardinals football team represented Lamar University in the 2019 NCAA Division I FCS football season as a member of the Southland Conference. The Cardinals were led by third-year head coach Mike Schultz and played their home games at Provost Umphrey Stadium.  The Cardinals played a twelve game regular season schedule in 2019.  The schedule included three non-conference and nine conference games.

TV and radio media
All Lamar games were broadcast on KLVI, also known as News Talk 560.

Previous season
The Cardinals finished the season with a 7–5 overall record.  They were 6–3 in Southland play finishing in third place. They received an at-large berth to the FCS Playoffs, where they lost in the first round to Northern Iowa 13–16.

Preseason

Preseason poll
The Southland Conference released their preseason poll on July 18, 2019. The Cardinals were picked to finish in fifth place.

Preseason All–Southland Teams
The Cardinals placed three players on the preseason all–Southland teams.

Defense

1st team

Daniel Crosley – DL

Offense

2nd team

Myles Wanza – RB

Elvin Martinez – PK

Schedule

Game summaries

Bethel (TN)
See also Bethel Wildcats
Sources:

Mississippi Valley State

Sources:

at Texas A&M

Sources:

at Southeastern Louisiana

Sources:

Stephen F. Austin

Sources:

Abilene Christian

Sources:

at Sam Houston State

Sources:

at Incarnate Word

Sources:

Central Arkansas

Sources:

at Northwestern State

Sources:

at Houston Baptist

Sources:

McNeese State

Sources:

Ranking movements

References

Lamar
Lamar Cardinals football seasons
Lamar Cardinals football